Dancers Hill House is a Grade II listed house in Dancers Hill, Hertfordshire, England. The current house dates from 1750–60, with later additions, and was probably built for Charles Ross, a Westminster builder, who leased 10 acres from David Hechstetter Jr. for 80 years in 1750. The grotto north-east of the house is also Grade II listed.

The house has been used as a school, and during the Second World War it was part of Camp 33, which housed Italian prisoners of war.

In 2018, the owners, Nigel and Melanie Walsh, who bought the house in 1992, offered it for sale by raffle, with a winner being drawn in January 2020.

References

External links 
Official website

Grade II listed houses in Hertfordshire
Grottoes
Neoclassical architecture in Hertfordshire
Palladian architecture in England
Buildings and structures completed in the 18th century
Country houses in Hertfordshire
Former school buildings in the United Kingdom
World War II prisoner of war camps in England